Pseudorhaphitoma stipendiarii is a small sea snail, a marine gastropod mollusk in the family Mangeliidae.

Description
The length of the shell varies between 5.5 mm and 7.5 mm.

Distribution
This marine genus occurs off Zululand, South Africa and Zanzibar

References

 R.N. Kilburn, Turridae (Mollusca: Gastropoda) of southern Africa and Mozambique. Part 7. Subfamily Mangeliinae, section 2; Annals of the Natal Museum 34, pp 317 - 367 (1993)

External links
 
 

stipendiarii
Gastropods described in 1993